Lyndsey Fry (born October 30, 1992) is a retired American ice hockey player. She was a member of the United States women's national ice hockey team. Fry was born in Mesa, Arizona, but grew up in Chandler, Arizona. She played college hockey for Harvard University.

Fry competed at the 2014 Winter Olympics in Sochi, Russia, where the USA team won the silver medal.

In January 2021, Fry was announced as part of the Arizona Coyotes radio broadcast team.

Career stats

NCAA

References

External links 
 

1992 births
American women's ice hockey forwards
Arizona Coyotes announcers
Harvard Crimson women's ice hockey players
Ice hockey people from Arizona
Ice hockey players at the 2014 Winter Olympics
Living people
Medalists at the 2014 Winter Olympics
Olympic silver medalists for the United States in ice hockey
Sportspeople from Mesa, Arizona